Wickhaven is a populated place in Fayette County, Pennsylvania, United States. Wickhaven is located along Pennsylvania Route 51.  It is 965 feet above sea level.

Geography
Wickhaven is located at  (40.123, -79.773).

References

Pittsburgh metropolitan area
Unincorporated communities in Fayette County, Pennsylvania
Unincorporated communities in Pennsylvania